Gymnodoris rubropapulosa is a species of colourful sea slug, a dorid nudibranch, a marine gastropod mollusk in the family Polyceridae. It was first described in 1828.

Distribution
This species is known from the tropical Indo-Pacific Ocean.

Description
Gymnodoris rubropapulosa is a large dorid nudibranch up to 60 mm in length. It has a white body covered with many orange spots, an orange mantle-edge and orange-lined rhinophores.

References

 Gosliner T.M., Behrens D.W. & Valdés A. (2008) Indo-Pacific nudibranchs and sea slugs. Sea Challengers Natural History Books and California Academy of Sciences. 426 pp.

External links
 http://www.seaslugforum.net/find/gymnrubr Gymnodoris rubropapulosa (Gymnodoris impudica) at the seaslug forum.

Polyceridae
Gastropods described in 1905